Oscar Karlsson (born 23 January 1992) is a Swedish footballer who plays for Nyköpings BIS as a midfielder.

References

External links

1992 births
Living people
Association football midfielders
Gefle IF players
IK Brage players
Nyköpings BIS players
Swedish footballers
Allsvenskan players